The 2020 NWHL Draft took place on April 28–29, 2020. The Boston Pride selected Sammy Davis with the 1st overall pick, having made a trade with the yet unnamed Toronto expansion team. Davis becomes the third Terriers hockey player to go first overall in a professional hockey draft, following Kayla Tutino in the 2016 CWHL Draft, and Rick DiPietro in the 2000 NHL Entry Draft.

A total of 30 players were drafted, of which 16 are American, 13 are Canadian, and one is Czech. The draft included players who have already finished their college eligibility for the first time.

The draft took place remotely due to the COVID-19 pandemic. Athletes from the WNBA and the National Lacrosse League presented the draft, as well as HC Bern general manager Florence Schelling, UFC contestant Roxanne Modafferi, and former NHL player Pat LaFontaine. That model has been cited as potential inspiration for other leagues in holding virtual drafts.

Autumn MacDougall, who skated for the University of Alberta Pandas women's ice hockey program, became the first player in the history of U Sports women's ice hockey to be selected in the NWHL Draft. Taken with the 14th overall pick, MacDougall was followed by another U Sports skater, as Erin Locke, a forward with the York Lions women's ice hockey, was taken by the Toronto expansion team 15th overall.

Results

Rounds 1–2

Rounds 3–5

References 

Premier Hockey Federation